Hutt South is a parliamentary electorate in the lower Hutt Valley of New Zealand. It is held by Ginny Andersen of the Labour Party following the 2020 election. It was previously held by Chris Bishop of the National Party Bishop's victory was the first time Hutt South has been held by a National Party MP since the electorate was created in 1996. Labour regained the electorate subsequently in the 2020 New Zealand general election.

Population centres
The electorate is based on the southern part of the city of Lower Hutt. It was formed in 1996 from the old electorates of Pencarrow and Eastern Hutt. Hutt South consists of the southern suburbs of Lower Hutt, Petone, Wainuiomata, and Eastbourne.

Since 2014, the following suburbs of Lower Hutt fall within Hutt South.

 Alicetown
 Belmont
 Boulcott
 Days Bay
 Eastbourne
 Epuni (south of and including Roberts Street)
 Fairfield
 Gracefield
 Harbour View
 Hutt Central
 Kelson
 Korokoro
 Lowry Bay
 Mahina Bay
 Maungaraki
 Melling
 Moera
 Normandale
 Petone
 Point Howard
 Seaview
 Sorrento Bay
 Sunshine Bay
 Tirohanga
 Wainuiomata
 Waiwhetū
 Waterloo
 Woburn
 York Bay

History
Mallard was returned at every general election until he moved to list-only at the 2017 election.

Members of Parliament
Key

List MPs
Members of Parliament elected from party lists in elections where that person also unsuccessfully contested the Hutt South electorate. Unless otherwise stated, all MPs terms began and ended at general elections.

Election results

2020 election

2017 election

2014 election

2011 election

Electorate (as at 26 November 2011): 43,215

2008 election

Note: lines coloured beige denote the winner of the electorate vote. Lines coloured pink denote a candidate elected to Parliament from their party list.

2005 election

2002 election

1999 election

1996 election

Table footnotes

References

New Zealand electorates
Lower Hutt